Medynsky, Medinsky, Medynský, Medinski or Medynskiy may refer to
 Medynsky District in Kaluga Oblast, Russia
Pavel Medynský (born 1964), Czech football manager
Vladimir Medinsky (born 1970), Russian politician